Tony Pastore (born 16 April 1966) is a former Australian rules footballer who played with Richmond in the Victorian Football League (VFL).

Pastore played his only senior game for Richmond in round six of the 1987 VFL season, in a loss to Melbourne at the MCG.

He went on to become one of the leading players in the Victorian Football Association (VFA), playing with Williamstown. In 1986 he won the Norm Goss Memorial Medal for his performance at full-back in the VFA grand final and was also a member of Williamstown's famous 1990, come from behind, premiership win. He was club captain in his final two seasons, 1996 and 1997.

In 2003, Pastore was named on the interchange bench in the official Williamstown "Team of the Century".

References

External links
 
 

1966 births
Australian rules footballers from Victoria (Australia)
Richmond Football Club players
Williamstown Football Club players
Living people